Breitkreuz is a surname. Notable people with the surname include:

Brett Breitkreuz (born 1989), Canadian ice hockey player
Clarke Breitkreuz (born 1991), Canadian ice hockey player
Cliff Breitkreuz, Canadian politician
Christoph Breitkreuz, German geologist
Garry Breitkreuz, Canadian politician
 

Surnames of German origin